Fabio Filice (born July 16, 1981) is a Canadian former Canadian Football League guard who retired after the 2008 CFL season. Filice played most of his career as an offensive lineman with his crowning achievement coming in 2008 when he won the Grey Cup with the Calgary Stampeders.

References
 Fabio's Profile
 CFL biography and statistics

1981 births
Living people
Calgary Stampeders players
Edmonton Elks players
Hamilton Tiger-Cats players
McMaster Marauders football players
Canadian people of Calabrian descent
Players of Canadian football from Ontario
Sportspeople from Hamilton, Ontario
Toronto Argonauts players